, or Partners: The Movie III is a 2014 Japanese mystery suspense crime film directed by Seiji Izumi and based on the television series AIBOU: Tokyo Detective Duo.

Cast
Yutaka Mizutani
Hiroki Narimiya
Tsuyoshi Ihara
Yumiko Shaku
Toru Kazama

Reception
The film grossed US$19.8 million in Japan.

References

External links
 

2010s crime films
2010s mystery films
Films based on television series
Japanese crime films
Japanese mystery films
2010s Japanese films
Toei Company films